Andrea Gabriel is an American actress. She is known for her role on the ABC drama series Lost as Sayid Jarrah's love interest Nadia Jazeem.

Acting career
Aside from her recurring role in Lost, Gabriel has guest starred in Criminal Minds and House. In October 2010, she was cast in The Twilight Saga: Breaking Dawn – Part 2 as "Kebi", a vampire from the Egyptian Coven.

Filmography

References

External links
 
 

20th-century American actresses
21st-century American actresses
Actresses from Los Angeles
Year of birth missing (living people)
American film actresses
American television actresses
Living people
Jewish American actresses
American people of Polish-Jewish descent
American people of Russian-Jewish descent